The Council of Ministers (1957–59) of Legislative Assembly, Kerala state (better known as E. M. S. Namboodiripad ministry - first term) was the first Council of Ministers, the executive wing of state government, in the Indian state of Kerala. The ministry was led (Chief Minister) by Communist Party of India leader E. M. S. Namboodiripad from 5 April 1957 to 31 July 1959 and had eleven ministries.

One of the first democratically elected Communist governments in the world after San Marino (1942-1947), Namboodiripad and his cabinet are known for their introduction of the Land Reform Ordinance and the Education Bill. The government was dismissed in 1959 by the Central Government, which invoked the controversial Article 356 of the Indian Constitution, following what later became known as The Liberation Struggle.

The State of Kerala was formed on 1 November 1956 as per the States Reorganisation Act of 1956. The erstwhile Travancore-Cochin and the Malabar district of Madras state were reorganized to form the state of Kerala. After the first ever elections to the Kerala Legislative Assembly in 1957, the Communist Party of India emerged as the single largest party. E M S Namboodiripad formed the first elected government with the support of 5 independent legislators. The government was not able to complete its full 5 years term. Government was dismissed by the President of India by the use of Article 356 of Indian constitution following the 'Liberation Struggle' (Vimochana Samaram in Malayalam).

The Kerala Council of Ministers, during Namboodiripad's term as Chief Minister of Kerala, consisted of:6

References

 http://www.niyamasabha.org/codes/Ministers%20Book%20Final.pdf

Namboodiripad
Communist Party of India state ministries
1957 establishments in Kerala
1959 disestablishments in India
Cabinets established in 1957
Cabinets disestablished in 1959